The Outlook Magazine is a Chinese creative lifestyle magazine.

The Outlook has been published in Shanghai continuously since October 2002 by Modern Media Group. The editor-in-chief is Jiaojiao Chen and the art director is Peng Yangjun; both of them used to be authors of COLORS magazine during 2006 to 2008.
As winner for The Society of Publishers in Asia’s Awards for Editorial Excellence, it was also recognized as a “new generation Chinese magazine” in 2009 by Wallpaper.

References

External links
 The Outlook Magazine's official website
 online copies in issue.com

2002 establishments in China
Lifestyle magazines
Magazines established in 2002
Magazines published in Shanghai